Abai or ABAI may refer to:

People 
 Abai (martyr) (died 363), saint of the Syrian Church
 Abai Ikwechegh (born 1923), Nigerian jurist
 Abai Qunanbaiuly (1845-1904), Kazakh poet and philosopher
 Abai Tasbolatov (born 1951), Kazakh politician

Places
Abai Region, Kazakhstan
 Abaí, Caazapá Department, Paraguay
 Abai village, Sokcho City, Gangwon Province, South Korea
 Abae, a city of ancient Greece

Other uses  
 Abai (opera), a 1944 Kazakh-language opera
 Abai (house), a traditional village meeting house
 Abai language
 Abai Kazakh National Pedagogical University, in Almaty, Kazakhstan
 American Board of Allergy and Immunology, a member board of the American Board of Medical Specialties
 Association for Behavior Analysis International
 Asthma & Bronchitis Association of India

See also
Abay (disambiguation)